King's skink (Egernia kingii) is a species of skink, a lizard in the family Scincidae. The species is endemic to Australia.

Etymology
The specific name, kingii, is in honor of Australian Phillip Parker King, who explored the coast of Australia while he was an officer in the Royal Navy.

Geographic range
King's skink is native to coastal regions of south-western Australia. It is common on Rottnest Island and Penguin Island and some coastal areas with open forest and open heath.

Description

Diet
King's skink is omnivorous and consumes mostly softer plant matter from the range of local vegetation, but supplements its diet with insects and birds' eggs.

As prey
King's skink is prey for many animals including tiger snakes (Notechis spp.).

History
A traditional name for King's skink is wandy, given by the Nyungar people of south-west Western Australia. The first European to draw a King's skink was the artist and naturalist Ferdinand Bauer who made a detailed drawing of one during Flinders' expedition in 1801.

Reproduction
Juvenile mortality is high and growth to adult size is slow, so mature King's skinks can be quite long lived.

References

Further reading
Boulenger GA (1887). Catalogue of the Lizards in the British Museum (Natural History). Second Edition. Volume III. ... Scincidæ ... London: Trustees of the British Museum (Natural History). (Taylor and Francis, printers). xii + 575 pp. + Plates I-XL. (Egernia kingii, pp. 138–139).
Glauert L (1960). "Herpetological miscellanea. XII. The family Scincidae in Western Australia. Part 1. The genera Tiliqua, Trachysaurus and Egernia ". Western Australian Naturalist 7 (3): 67-77. 
Gray JE (1838). "Catalogue of the Slender-tongued Saurians, with Descriptions of many new Genera and Species". Ann. Mag. Nat. Hist., First Series 2: 287-293. (Tiliqua kingii, new species, p. 290).

External links
Australian Faunal Directory
More photos
Distribution map

Egernia
Reptiles of Western Australia
Skinks of Australia
Endemic fauna of Australia
Reptiles described in 1838
Taxa named by John Edward Gray